Panama is scheduled to compete at the 2017 World Aquatics Championships in Budapest, Hungary from 14 July to 30 July.

Swimming

Panama has received a Universality invitation from FINA to send three swimmers (one man and two women) to the World Championships.

Synchronized swimming

Panama's synchronized swimming team consisted of 3 athletes (1 male and 2 female).

Mixed

 Legend: (R) = Reserve Athlete

References

Nations at the 2017 World Aquatics Championships
Panama at the World Aquatics Championships
2017 in Panamanian sport